Crassula ericoides is a species of succulent plant in the genus Crassula native to South Africa. Growing in the fynbos ecosystem of South Africa, C. ericoides somewhat resembles a heather, growing into an upright shrub with bare lower stems and yellow flowers at the tips.

Subspecies 
Crassula ericoides has two subspecies: 

 Crassula ericoides subsp. ericoides
 Crassula ericoides subsp. tortuosa

C. ericoides subsp. ericoides is more common, whereas subsp. tortuosa is a prostrate shrub form that grows at higher elevations.

References

ericoides
Plants described in 1825